The Scottish Amateur is the national amateur match play golf championship of Scotland. It has been played since 1922 and is organised by the Scottish Golf Union. It is a "closed" event with entry currently restricted to those who were either born in Scotland, have Scottish parentage, or are permanently resident in Scotland for at least the previous five years.

Format
The tournament used to use the match play format, beginning with 256 players. The first seven rounds, up to the semi-finals, were contested over 18 holes, whilst the final was contested over 36 holes. Eight players were given a seeding in the first round. However in 2017, the format was changed to a stroke play qualification, followed by match play for the top 64 stroke play qualifiers.

Originally the semi-finals and final were played on the final day but in 1928 the final was extended to 36 holes. In 1931, a 36-hole qualifying stage was introduced, played on a Monday and Tuesday generally on two courses, although occasionally on just one course. The leading 64 qualified with the first round played on Wednesday, two further rounds on Thursday and Friday and the final on Saturday. In 1931 there was an evening playoff for those tied for the final places but from 1932 all those tying for the final place qualified and there was a preliminary round on the Wednesday to reduce the number to 64. From 1955 the championship returned to a pure match-play event.

Winners

External links
Scottish Golf
List of winners

Amateur golf tournaments in the United Kingdom
Golf tournaments in Scotland
1922 establishments in Scotland
Recurring sporting events established in 1922
Annual sporting events in the United Kingdom